"Army of Me" is a 1995 song by Björk.

Army of Me may also refer to:
 Army of Me (band), an American alternative rock band
 "Army of Me" (Christina Aguilera song), 2012